Mohawk Correctional Facility is a state prison for men in Rome, Oneida County, New York, owned and operated by the New York State Department of Corrections and Community Supervision.  The facility is classified as medium security but also has a maximum security unit and a special housing unit.  Mohawk held 1167 inmates (as of 2011) and first opened in 1988.

References 

Buildings and structures in Oneida County, New York
Prisons in New York (state)
1988 establishments in New York (state)